Predrag Ranđelović (born 13 September 1976) is a Serbian former professional footballer who played as a striker.

Playing career
After playing in his homeland, Ranđelović moved to Russia and signed with Anzhi Makhachkala in 1999. He was the top scorer of the Dagestan-based club with 12 league goals in the 2000 season. After two years there, Ranđelović went on to play for CSKA Moscow and Zenit Saint Petersburg.

In the summer of 2008, Ranđelović joined Montenegrin club Rudar Pljevlja. He stayed there for the next two and a half years, scoring 40 goals in the First League. In the 2011 winter transfer window, Ranđelović moved to Mogren, helping them win the national championship that season.

In the 2012 winter transfer window, Ranđelović returned to his country and joined SuperLiga club Sloboda Užice. He was the league's second-highest scorer with 18 goals in the 2012–13 season. In the summer of 2013, Ranđelović moved to Kolubara, but retired from the game shortly after.

Post-playing career
In March 2016, Ranđelović briefly served as caretaker manager of Rudar Pljevlja, together with Vuko Bogavac.

Statistics

Honours
Anzhi Makhachkala
 Russian First Division: 1999
Rudar Pljevlja
 Montenegrin First League: 2009–10
 Montenegrin Cup: 2009–10
Mogren
 Montenegrin First League: 2010–11

References

External links
 
 
 

Association football forwards
2. Liga (Austria) players
Expatriate footballers in Austria
Expatriate footballers in Greece
Expatriate footballers in Montenegro
Expatriate footballers in Romania
Expatriate footballers in Russia
FC Admira Wacker Mödling players
FC Anzhi Makhachkala players
FC U Craiova 1948 players
FC Zenit Saint Petersburg players
First League of Serbia and Montenegro players
FK Bežanija players
FK Kolubara players
FK Mogren players
FK Obilić players
FK Radnički Niš players
FK Rudar Pljevlja managers
FK Rudar Pljevlja players
FK Sloboda Užice players
FK Zvezdara players
Football League (Greece) players
Liga I players
Montenegrin First League players
Niki Volos F.C. players
PFC CSKA Moscow players
Russian Premier League players
Serbia and Montenegro expatriate footballers
Serbia and Montenegro expatriate sportspeople in Greece
Serbia and Montenegro expatriate sportspeople in Romania
Serbia and Montenegro expatriate sportspeople in Russia
Serbia and Montenegro footballers
Serbian expatriate footballers
Serbian expatriate sportspeople in Austria
Serbian expatriate sportspeople in Montenegro
Serbian football managers
Serbian footballers
Serbian SuperLiga players
Sportspeople from Niš
1976 births
Living people